Drayer is a surname. Notable people with the surname include:

Burton Drayer, American radiologist
Clarence Drayer (1901–1977), American football player
Michael Drayer (born 1986), American actor
Shannon Drayer, American sports journalist

See also
Draper (surname)
Dreyer
Grayer